Abernathy High School is a public high school located in Abernathy, Texas, United States. It is part of the Abernathy Independent School District located in central Hale County and classified as a 3A school by the UIL. In 2015, the school was rated "Met Standard" by the Texas Education Agency.

Athletics
The Abernathy Antelopes compete in cross country, American football, basketball, powerlifting, tennis, track, golf, softball and baseball.

State titles
Boys' basketball - 
1980(2A), 1991(2A)
Girls' basketball - 
1958(2A), 1959(2A), 1981(3A), 1984(3A), 1986(2A), 1991(2A)
Boys' cross country - 
1984(2A)
Girls' cross country - 
1978(B), 1991(2A)

State finalists
Girls' basketball - 
1985(2A), 1989(2A), 2003(2A)

References

External links
Abernathy ISD

Public high schools in Texas
Schools in Hale County, Texas